Nawab Arastu Yar Jung (10 June 1858 – 25 March 1940) (Arabic: نواب أرسطو يار جنك) was a Hyderabadi surgeon.

He became well known during late Nizam period of Hyderabad, during the early 20th century, for being chief physician and advisor to the Nizam of the time, Mahbub Ali Khan, Asaf Jah VI, and later becoming a prominent philanthropist in what is known today as the "Old City" portion of Hyderabad.

Early life and career
Abdul Husain Arastu Yar Jung was born as Abdul Husain in the then independent state of Hyderabad. Arastu Yar Jung completed medical school and began practicing in what is known today as the "Old City" of Hyderabad. He was appointed to the staff of Osmania General Hospital, where he eventually became the First Superintendent. Arastu Yar Jung was soon appointed as the First Surgeon to the reigning Nizam Mahbub Ali Khan, Asaf Jah VI, the Sixth Nizam of Hyderabad. The Nizam officially conferred him his title; and from that day he was known as Dr. Abdul Husain Arastu Yar Jung (Arastu, Karim and Michelle 2016).

He remained a adviser to the Nizam. Alongside this, Arastu Yar Jung became known for serving the needy and the poor for the local communities, even at night, often treating patients at no cost. He also became a physician in Hyderabad.

Philanthropy
Parts of Southern India and most of Hyderabad were greatly affected by the Bubonic plague epidemic at the turn of the 19th century. Arastu Yar Jung helped treat many of the locals affected, and often invited their whole families to live in separate quarters of his own home - providing ample food and shelter for all who stayed.

As a member of the Bohra Muslim jamaat, Arastu Yar Jung was an active contributor to the local community through the Dawoodi Bohra organization. Alongside other active "Old City" Hyderabad Bohri community members of the time, such as his brother-in-law Sheikh Mohsini, Mullah Abdul Tyeb, and his son-in-law, of the Sk. Hasan Bhai clan, Mullah Mohammed Bhai - a respected Judge for the Hyderabad High Court (now Andhra Pradesh High Court) among others.

With Sheikh Mohsini, Arastu Yar Jung was largely responsible for the finance and construction of the Husainialam mosque, approved by the then Syedna Taher Saifuddin and completed in 1913. To honor their contribution and commitment to the community, Arastu Yar Jung and Sheikh Mohsini were both buried near the mosque. The mosque is still in use today, and has since been named the Burhani Masjid, as part of the Anjuman-E-Taheri jamaat. The original structure has been slightly modified, but remains intact, after it was declared a historic landmark in 2003.

A strong proponent of education, Arastu Yar Jung, along with many others including Mullah Mohammed Bhai, financed the education of community members - establishing educational trusts that allowed the youth to pursue higher education.

Still much of the contributions remain unknown, as he paid attention to be discrete in providing aid, so that the particular person can save face in society - quoting the Quran, "What the right hand gives, the left hand should not so much as get a hint of." This implies that the respect of the person being served, and complete confidentiality of the service being rendered is essential in the etiquette of charity.

Legacy
Arastu Yar Jung encouraged all of his sons to pursue higher education, even sending some abroad to Great Britain and United States, as many noblemen also began doing at the time. Similarly, his daughters were married into families where education was also highly valued. This helped ensure that his values and good will were passed down. Like Arastu Yar Jung, his children were deeply committed to succeeding in education and contributing immensely to the local community.

Like families of many Hyderabadi noblemen, many of Arastu Yar Jung's descendants immigrated to the United States and United Kingdom, throughout the 20th century, for the pursuit of higher education opportunities. Today his descendants are scattered around the world, many identifiable by the surname Arastu, with a majority residing in the United States, Canada, India, Pakistan, United Kingdom, Kuwait, and the United Arab Emirates - numbering close to one thousand, and spanning six generations.
There is a biography published in 2019 that also highlights the history of medical advances in Hyderabad Deccan during his lifetime, titled - "Dr. Arastu Yar Jung: A short biography of the royal physician to the Nizams with the history of medical advances in Hyderabad Deccan during his lifetime. (b. 1858 - d. 1940)."

References

Bibliography
Arastu, Karim and Michelle. Personal interview. 22 June 2016.
Proceedings of the annual conference
By Alabama Home Economics Association, Association of Assistant Librarians. Scottish Division, Conference, Irish Accounting and Finance Association
Published by University of Ulster, 1986
page 271

History of Hyderabad District, 1879-1950 A.D., Yugabda 4981-5052
By Mukkamala Radhakrishna Sarma, Krishna Damodar Abhyankar, S. G. Moghe
Published by Bharatiya Itihasa Sankalana Samiti, 1987
Item notes: v. 2
Original from the University of Michigan
Digitized 3 September 2008.

Dr. Arastu Yar Jung: A short biography of the royal physician to the Nizams with the history of medical advances in Hyderabad Deccan during his lifetime. (b. 1858 - d. 1940) 
by Dr. Naveed Hussain (Author), Tasneem Ebrahim Hussain (Editor), Aamir N Hussain (Editor)
Publisher ‏ : ‎ Independently published (July 29, 2019); Language ‏ : ‎ English
ISBN-10 ‏ : ‎ 1079350632; ISBN-13 ‏ : ‎ 978-1079350630

External links
 Osmania University, Hyderabad, India
 Samad Arastu
 LV Prasad Eye Institute - Dr Nawab Arastu Yar Jung Fellowship

Medical doctors from Hyderabad, India
19th-century Indian medical doctors
1858 births
1940 deaths
20th-century Indian medical doctors
Indian surgeons
20th-century surgeons
People from Hyderabad State